Socastee is a census-designated place (CDP) in Horry County, South Carolina, United States. The population was 19,952 at the 2010 census.

History
Socastee is an Indigenous American name referred to as "Sawkastee" in a 1711 land grant to Percival Pawley.  A skirmish between small forces of American and British troops occurred near Socastee Creek in 1781.  By the 1870s, the Socastee community was a significant center for the production and distribution of naval stores such as turpentine and tar. This area included a saw mill, turpentine distilleries, cotton gin, grist mill, cooper shop and general store.  The Socastee Historic District was listed in the National Register of Historic Places in 2002.

Geography
Socastee is located at  (33.686 -78.993).

According to the United States Census Bureau, the CDP has a total area of 13.9 square miles (36.0 km2), of which 13.4 square miles (34.6 km2) is land and 0.5 square mile (1.4 km2) (3.81%) is water.

Demographics

2020 census

As of the 2020 United States census, there were 22,213 people, 8,798 households, and 5,903 families residing in the CDP.

2000 census
As of the census of 2000, there were 14,295 people, 5,593 households, and 3,820 families living in the CDP. The population density was 1,069.1 people per square mile (412.8/km2). There were 6,356 housing units at an average density of 475.4 per square mile (183.6/km2). The racial makeup of the CDP was 86.81% White, 7.01% African American, 0.35% Native American, 2.10% Asian, 0.13% Pacific Islander, 2.01% from other races, and 1.59% from two or more races. Hispanic or Latino of any race were 4.66% of the population.

There were 5,593 households, out of which 33.1% had children under the age of 18 living with them, 52.4% were married couples living together, 11.3% had a female householder with no husband present, and 31.7% were non-families. 22.7% of all households were made up of individuals, and 4.6% had someone living alone who was 65 years of age or older. The average household size was 2.54 and the average family size was 2.97.

In the CDP, the population was spread out, with 24.3% under the age of 18, 9.7% from 18 to 24, 34.9% from 25 to 44, 22.7% from 45 to 64, and 8.4% who were 65 years of age or older. The median age was 34 years. For every 100 females, there were 102.0 males. For every 100 females age 18 and over, there were 101.4 males.

The median income for a household in the CDP was $40,436, and the median income for a family was $45,994. Males had a median income of $28,845 versus $21,782 for females. The per capita income for the CDP was $18,069. About 5.6% of families and 9.3% of the population were below the poverty line, including 13.7% of those under age 18 and 7.8% of those age 65 or over.

Education
Socastee has a public library, a branch of the Horry County Memorial Library.

See also
 Socastee Historic District

References

Census-designated places in Horry County, South Carolina
Census-designated places in South Carolina